Christina Noble  is an Irish children's rights campaigner, charity worker and writer, who founded the Christina Noble Children's Foundation in 1989.

Noble was born on 23 December 1944, in Dublin, Ireland. Her mother died when she was ten. She was sent to an orphanage and dishonestly told that her three siblings were dead. She escaped and lived rough in Dublin, where she was gang-raped, which left her pregnant. Her baby son was adopted, against her will. After discovering the state had lied about the death of her siblings, Christina located her brother in England moved there to live with him after she turned 18. This is where she met and married her husband and had three children, Helenita, Nicolas and Androula. She was a victim of domestic violence.

In 1989, after her own children were grown, she visited Vietnam and began to care for homeless children. This action was inspired by a recurring dream she had during the Vietnam War. This eventually led her to create the Christina Noble Children's Foundation. To date, she and the Foundation have helped over 700,000 children in Vietnam and Mongolia.

She appeared as a castaway on the BBC Radio programme Desert Island Discs on 15 June 1997. She was the subject of This Is Your Life in 2002 when she was surprised by Michael Aspel at a fundraising fashion show and auction in central London. Despite being from Ireland, she was made an Officer of the Order of the British Empire (OBE).
She is a recipient of the 2014 Women of the Year Prudential Lifetime Achievement Award.

Christina Noble was the subject of the 2014 documentary, In A House that Ceased to Be. It charts the reunion of Christina with her remaining siblings after fifty-three years, one brother and two sisters, from whom she was separated at a very young age.  The film about her life, Noble, was released 8 May 2015 under the direction of Stephen Bradley. In an interview for the film with Irish Times she said, “I loved God and Jesus so much. I still do.”

Bibliography

References 

Living people
1944 births
20th-century Irish women writers
21st-century Irish women writers
Officers of the Order of the British Empire
Writers from Dublin (city)
Recipients of the Friendship Order